Đurđa Adlešič (also Đurđa Adlešić; born 9 August 1960) is a former Croatian politician and former leader of the center-right Croatian Social Liberal Party (HSLS).

Adlešič entered politics in 1990 and was one of the founders of Croatian Social Liberal Party in her hometown. She became an MP in 1995. In 2000, she won her second term and became the vice-president of the party. In 2001 she became the mayor of Bjelovar. In 2003 she won her third term in the Parliament, and was reelected as mayor in 2005. She served as the president of the Croatian Social Liberal party from 2006 to 2009.

In 2010 Adlešič left the HSLS and retired from politics in 2011.

Sources

 Đurđa Adlešić

External links
Hrvatski sabor - Đurđa Adlešič 

1960 births
Living people
People from Bjelovar
Representatives in the modern Croatian Parliament
Croatian Social Liberal Party politicians
Candidates for President of Croatia
University of Banja Luka alumni
Women mayors of places in Croatia
20th-century Croatian women politicians
20th-century Croatian politicians
21st-century Croatian women politicians
21st-century Croatian politicians